Darren Van Oene (born January 18, 1978) is a Canadian former professional ice hockey winger.  Picked 33rd overall from the Western Hockey League's Brandon Wheat Kings by the Buffalo Sabres in the second round of the 1996 NHL Entry Draft, he never played in the National Hockey League, spending his entire career in the minor leagues.

Van Oene debuted with Buffalo's American Hockey League affiliate, the Rochester Americans, in the 1998–1999 season.  He played with the Americans for four seasons before the Boston Bruins signed him as a free agent on July 29, 2002 and assigned him to their AHL team, the Providence Bruins.  After playing two seasons and part of a third with Providence, Van Oene finished the 2004–05 season by moving between the AHL's Manchester Monarchs and Worcester IceCats, and also spent time in the United Hockey League with the Elmira Jackals.

Career statistics

References

External links

1978 births
Brandon Wheat Kings players
Buffalo Sabres draft picks
Canadian expatriate ice hockey players in the United States
Canadian ice hockey left wingers
Canadian people of Dutch descent
Elmira Jackals (UHL) players
Living people
Manchester Monarchs (AHL) players
Providence Bruins players
Rochester Americans players
Ice hockey people from Edmonton
Worcester IceCats players